The United States No Electronic Theft Act (NET Act), a federal law passed in 1997, provides for criminal prosecution of individuals who engage in copyright infringement under certain circumstances, even when there is no monetary profit or commercial benefit from the infringement. Maximum penalties can be five years in prison with fines.

History
Prior to the enactment of the NET Act in 1997, criminal copyright infringement required that the infringement was for the purpose of "commercial advantage or private financial gain." Merely uploading and downloading files on the internet did not fulfill this requirement, meaning that even large-scale online infringement could not be prosecuted criminally.

This state of affairs was underscored by the unsuccessful 1994 prosecution of David LaMacchia, then a student at the Massachusetts Institute of Technology, for allegedly facilitating massive copyright infringement as a hobby, without any commercial motive. The court's dismissal of United States v. LaMacchia suggested that then-existing criminal law simply did not apply to non-commercial infringements (a state of affairs which became known as the "LaMacchia Loophole"). The court suggested that Congress could act to make some non-commercial infringements a crime, and Congress acted on that suggestion in the NET Act.

The NET Act amended the definition of "commercial advantage or private financial gain" to include the "receipt, or expectation of receipt, of anything of value, including the receipt of other copyrighted works" (17 USC 101), and specifies penalties of up to five years in prison.

In addition, it added a threshold for criminal liability where the infringer neither obtained nor expected to obtain anything of value for the infringement – "by the reproduction or distribution, including by electronic means, during any 180-day period, of 1 or more copies or phonorecords of 1 or more copyrighted works, which have a total retail value of more than $ 1,000" (17 USC 506(a)(1)(B)). In response to the NET Act, the US Sentencing Commission stiffened sanctions for intellectual property infringement.

References

External links 

 Copyright Law of the United States of America (Library of Congress)
 Decision in U.S. v. LaMacchia

United States federal copyright legislation
United States federal computing legislation
Acts of the 105th United States Congress